Tasting Australia is a South Australian wine and food festival held in the capital city of Adelaide. It was first held in 1997 and managed by Marina Libia and event management company Consuming Passions, run by Ian Parmenter and David Evans.  Each year the event attracts more than 200 national and international journalists and around 50,000 visitors.

History 
The 2014 event hosted over 80 ticketed and free events throughout South Australia. The festival has been held biennially for 15 years and became annual from the 2016 event which was held from Sunday 1 May to Sunday 8 May 2016.

Due to government prohibitions on large crowds because of the COVID-19 pandemic in Australia, in 2020 the event was postponed to October/November, then cancelled.

In 2021 Tasting Australia is scheduled to be held from 30 April - 9 May 2021.

Creative directors 
In February 2015, South Australian Minister for Tourism Leon Bignell announced the two Creative Directors and Event Patron for the 2016 Tasting Australia event.

Simon Bryant 
Simon Bryant is one of two Creative Directors for Tasting Australia. Bryant worked with the Hilton Adelaide for more than ten years, culminating in becoming executive chef. He has worked alongside South Australian cook Maggie Beer, co-hosting more than 150 episodes of The Cook and the Chef on the ABC.

Paul Henry 
Paul Henry is a wine writer and marketer, and one of two Creative Directors of Tasting Australia. Henry established Winehero Australia in January 2011, a company specialising in strategic planning, brand development and communication, where he acts as a director.

Maggie Beer 
Maggie Beer has been a Patron for Tasting Australia. Beer has appeared as a guest judge on MasterChef Australia and runs Maggie Beer's Farm Shop in the Barossa Valley with a range of products sold throughout Australia and overseas. Beer was awarded the Centenary Medal in 2001 for service to Australian society through cooking and writing, and was named Senior Australian of the Year in 2010. In the Australia Day Honours of 2012, Beer was appointed a Member of the Order of Australia (AM) "for service to the tourism and hospitality industries as a cook, restaurateur and author, and to the promotion of Australian produce and cuisine."

Cheong Liew 
Cheong Liew took over from foodie Maggie Beer as Patron of Tasting Australia. Liew moved from Malaysia to Australia in 1969. He received his first critical acclaim for his Adelaide based restaurant Neddy’s. However, he is probably best known for his restaurant The Grange, which opened in the Adelaide Hilton Hotel in 1995 and closed in 2009.

Darren Robertson 
Darren Robertson is a chef, owner of Three Blue Ducks in Bronte, at first, and now Three Blue Ducks on The Farm at Byron Bay. Robertson has previously been a visiting chef at Tasting Australia but joins for the first time as 'Food Curator' in 2021.

Nick Stock 
Nick Stock is one of Australia's most respected and prolific wine critics. His involvement in wine stretches beyond wine-writing to show-judging, educating, broadcasting and winemaking.

References

External links
  Tasting Australia
Tasting Australia at TravelLady Magazine
Consuming Passions website
Interview with Ian Parmenter in ABC's Talking Heads

Festivals in Adelaide